Rihards Kuksiks (born July 17, 1988) is a Latvian professional basketball player for Pieno žvaigždės Pasvalys of the Lithuanian Basketball League (LKL). He is also a member of the senior Latvia national basketball team.

College career

2007–08 season 
In his freshman year, Kuksiks appeared in 27 games, and he averaged 5.4 points and 1.8 rebounds per game. He had double-digit scoring in six of the final 12 games of the season, including 15 points in a win at Washington, and 12 points in a big home win vs USC. He hit 21 three-pointers in the final nine games against Pac-10 teams. He also had 15 points, on 6-of-12 field goals, and had 3 three-pointers in a win over seventh-ranked Stanford, on Feb. 14.

2008–09 season 
In his sophomore year, Kuksiks established himself as a solid third option behind NBA draft picks James Harden and Jeff Pendergraph, by averaging 10.3 points in 33.1 minutes per game. That year ASU played in the NCAA Tournament.

2009–10 season 
After Harden and Pendergraph left for the NBA, Kuksiks' role in the team increased, and he finished the season leading the team in scoring, with an average of 12.1 points per game. In his junior year, Kuksiks had six 20-point games.

2010–11 season 
In his senior season, Kuksiks averaged 10.4 points per game. He finished his college basketball career at Arizona State, with 280 career three-pointers made, and he became the 34th member of ASU's 1,000-points scored club, as he finished his college career with 1,175 points.

Professional career 
After graduating from Arizona State, Kuksiks returned to Europe, and signed a pro contract with Valencia Basket, one of the top teams in the Spanish ACB League, which is often regarded as the best national domestic league in Europe. In October 2012, he returned to the Liga ACB, and joined Lagun Aro GBC. In the middle of the season, Kuksiks moved to the Ukrainian club BC Budivelnyk, which he helped to win the Ukrainian Super League domestic championship.

In the following season, Kuksiks returned to Latvia, where he played with VEF Rīga. In November 2014, he returned to playing on the basketball courts, after recovering from an injury, and he joined BK Jēkabpils. On January 16, 2015, he signed with Avtodor Saratov. On February 18, 2015, he left Avtodor. 

He then signed with the Russian club BC Nizhny Novgorod, where he made his debut in Europe's premiere basketball league, the EuroLeague. Nizhny Novgorod finished its season in the VTB United League season, after being eliminated by CSKA Moscow, with a 3–0 sweep in the league's playoff semifinal series. On June 18, 2015, he parted ways with Nizhny.

On August 23, 2015, he signed with the Romanian team BCM U Pitești. On November 6, 2015, he left Pitești and signed with the Italian club Pallacanestro Varese, for the rest of the season. On September 24, 2016, he signed with the Latvian club BK Ventspils. 

On January 4, 2017, he moved to the French club Hermine Nantes Basket, for the rest of the season. On October 19, 2017, he signed with the Lithuanian club BC Nevėžis. On November 28, 2017, he returned to Italy and signed a one-month deal with VL Pesaro, a team competing in the highest-tier level of the Italian league pyramid, the LBA. On December 20, 2017, he re-signed with Pesaro for one more month.

National team career 
Kuksiks was a member of the Latvian Under-16, Under-18 and Under-20 junior national teams. He has also been a member of the senior Latvian national basketball team.

In 2010, he was the leading scorer of the senior Latvian national team, averaging 13.3 points, to go along with 3.4 rebounds per game, in eight games played. In his best game against Israel, on August 8, he made seven three-pointers, which is the all-time Latvian national team record in official games. The previous record was six three-pointers made in one game, held by three different players (Sandis Valters, Uvis Helmanis and Ainars Bagatskis).

At the EuroBasket 2011, he was also the team's leading scorer, averaging 16 points a game. In the summer of 2012, he helped Latvia to qualify for the EuroBasket 2013, scoring 12.1 points per game.

References

External links
 eurobasket.com profile
 EuroLeague profile
 fibaeurope.com profile
 FIBA profile
 Arizona State Sun Devils bio

1988 births
Living people
Arizona State Sun Devils men's basketball players
Basketball players from Riga
BC Avtodor Saratov players
BC Budivelnyk players
BC Nevėžis players
BC Nizhny Novgorod players
BK VEF Rīga players
BK Ventspils players
Gipuzkoa Basket players
Larisa B.C. players
Latvian expatriate basketball people in Spain
Latvian expatriate basketball people in the United States
Latvian expatriate basketball people in Romania
Latvian men's basketball players
Liga ACB players
Pallacanestro Varese players
Shooting guards
Small forwards
Valencia Basket players
Victoria Libertas Pallacanestro players